The Australian Men's Interstate Teams Matches were an amateur team golf competition for men between the states and territories of Australia.

The event started in 1904 when New South Wales played Victoria. Until World War II the event was played as part of the championship meeting which included the Australian Amateur. It was not until 1947 that all six states, New South Wales, Queensland, South Australia, Tasmania, Victoria, and Western Australia, contested the event together. Northern Territory first played in 2015 increasing the number of teams to seven. The final format was a round-robin tournament, each team playing the other six teams, after which the top two teams play a final. Each team consisted of eight players. Seven competed in each round-robin match with all eight playing in the final. Only singles matches were played.

In 2020 the format for interstate team matches was changed so that the men's and women's event were combined into a single mixed-team event, the Australian Interstate Teams Matches.

History
The first match was played between New South Wales and Victoria at The Australian Golf Club on the afternoon of 1 September 1904, the day before the inaugural Australian Open started on the same course. Eight 18-hole singles matches were played. All matches were played out over the full 18 holes. Dan Soutar and Jim Howden halved the top match but New South Wales won 5 of the remaining 7 matches, winning by 11 holes to 6.

The first tournament was arranged in 1905 at Royal Melbourne, two days before the Australian Open there. It was hoped that Tasmania would enter but they were unable to raise a team. Victoria and South Australia were drawn in the morning semi-final, the winner meeting New South Wales in the final in the afternoon. There were teams of 6, playing singles. Victoria won the semi-final 6–0 and went on to beat New South Wales 4–1 with one match halved. Victoria won by 7 holes to 1. In 1906 at Royal Sydney only New South Wales and Victoria competed, the match being played the day after the final of the Australian Amateur. Victoria won 3–2 with one match halved, winning by 13 holes to 4. Three players each from Tasmania and Queensland played a match against a team of Royal Sydney members. The two finalists in the Australian Amateur, Ernest Gill, from Queensland, and Tasmanian Clyde Pearce both lost their matches.

Four teams contested the 1907 tournament at Royal Melbourne. The two semi-finals were very one-sided with Victoria winning all six matches against Tasmania and New South Wales only losing one match against South Australia, Bill Gunson beating Neptune Christoe. Victoria won the final 4–2, while Tasmania won a consolation match against South Australia. Only three teams entered at The Australian in 1908, South Australia getting a bye to the final. Victoria beat New South Wales 4–2 and went on to beat South Australia 6–0 in the final. Both Australian Amateur finalists, Clyde Pearce and Neptune Christoe, representing New South Wales, lost their matches against Victoria. Tasmania was able to raise a team in 1909 when the championship meeting returned to Royal Melbourne. In the morning semi-finals Victoria beat South Australia 6–0 while Tasmania beat New South Wales 5–1. Victoria beat Tasmania 4–2 in the final despite Clyde Pearce beating Michael Scott and his brother, Bruce, beating Jim Howden in the top two matches.

From 1910 the format was revised with teams of seven, the result being decided solely by the number of matches won. Extra holes were played to ensure a result in each match. In 1910 the championship meeting was held in Adelaide for the first time with the interstate tournament being played after the amateur championship. There were only a limited number of New South Wales players at the meeting and, with some having already left for home, they were unable to raise a team. Tasmania were also unable to field a side so there were only two teams, Victoria and South Australia, Victoria were without the amateur champion Michael Scott but still won 5–2. There were also only two teams at Royal Sydney in 1911, New South Wales beating Victoria 6–1, their first tournament win since 1904. Jim Howden beat Eric Apperly by one hole in the top match but Victoria lost all the remaining matches.

There were four teams when the event returned to Royal Melbourne in 1912. Victoria and New South Wales were drawn together in the semi-finals. Victoria won 4–3, winning two of their matches after extra holes. They went on to win the final against Tasmania, losing just one match. Tasmania had beaten South Australia 5–2 earlier in the day. The 1913 championship meeting was originally planned to be played at The Australian, but was moved to Royal Melbourne because of a smallpox outbreak and the poor condition of the course, caused by wet weather. There were less players from outside Victoria and only two teams, Victoria and South Australia, could raise a team. Victoria won by 6 matches to 1.

The format for the event was maintained between 1920 and 1939, as it continued to be played as part of the championship meeting. New South Wales and Victoria had a team each year. South Australia generally entered a team, although missing sometimes when it was held in Sydney. Queensland first entered a team in 1925 and occasionally entered afterwards when the event was in Sydney. The number of team was never more than four in this period, meaning that the event was always completed in a single day with semi-finals in the morning and the final in the afternoon. In 1924, Tasmania beat a weak New South Wales team, before losing to Victoria in the final. The 1926 event was in Adelaide and South Australia won a close semi-final against New South Wales before losing to Victoria. South Australia beat Victoria in 1932, again at Royal Adelaide, but lost to New South Wales in the final. South Australia won for the first time in 1935 at Royal Adelaide. They had a bye to the final and beat New South Wales 4–3 in a close contest. Queensland beat South Australia in 1937, their first win, but lost to New South Wales in the final. South Australia won again in 1938, when the meeting returning to Adelaide, beating both Victoria and New South Wales. In 1939, at Royal Melbourne, Western Australia entered a team for the first time and beat South Australia before losing to New South Wales in the final.

Five team entered when the event resumed at Royal Sydney in 1946. This meant that the tournament was extended to a second day for the first time, Queensland beating Victoria on the first day. Queensland then beat South Australia and New South Wales to win the tournament for the first time. There was a major change to the event for 1947. The event changed from a knock-out to a round-robin tournament with all six states playing each other, although there were still seven 18-hole singles matches in each contest between two states. There were five rounds of matches played over three days. It was played before the Australian Amateur, on the same course. New South Wales seemed the likely winner in 1947, after winning their first four matches. However they lost 5–2 to South Australia in their final match. Victoria, New South Wales and South Australia all won four of their five contests but Victoria won the event, having won 27 of their 35 individual matches, compared to the 23 won by the other two teams. Victoria retained the title in 1948, winning all their five matches with. New South Wales winning four.

In 1949 New South Wales won for the first time since 1937. They reversed the result of the previous year, winning all their matches, beating Victoria on the final day, who also won their other four matches. New South Wales retained the title in 1950, despite losing a close match to Victoria. Both New South Wales and Victoria won four matches but New South Wales had won 24 of the individual matches while Victoria had only won 23. New South Wales won again in 1951 winning all their matches. Victoria and Tasmania won three matches each, Victoria winning 21 individual matches to the 18 won by Tasmania. New South Wales won for the fourth successive year in 1952 winning all their matches. Victoria and Queensland each won three matches but Victoria won 21 individual matches to the 19 won by Queensland. The Western Australian Golf Association
presented a perpetual trophy to commemorate the first event held in the state.

Victoria won from 1953 to 1955. In 1953 they beat New South Wales in the final match. Victoria won four matches while New South Wales and Queensland won three each. New South Wales won 22 individual matches to Queensland's 21. There was a small change in the format in 1954 when extra holes were dropped, matches being halved. The change was not popular and extra holes returned in 1955. Victoria won again in 1954 despite losing heavily to New South Wales on the final day. New South Wales were runner-up with three wins and a tied match against Tasmania. Queensland hosted for the first time in 1955 and finished runner-up behind Victoria, who won all their matches.

New South Wales won each year from 1956 to 1960, winning 24 of their 25 matches. Their only loss was to Western Australia in 1959. Although beaten by New South Wales each year in this period, Victoria won all their other matches and finished runner-up each time. They tied with New South Wales with four wins each in 1959 but New South Wales won with 24 individual wins to Victoria's 21.

In 1961 Victoria regained the title, beating New South Wales for the first time since 1955. they won all their matches and did so again in 1963. 1962 saw the first tie in the event with New South Wales and South Australia both having four wins and winning 22 individual matches. New South Wales beat South Australia but had earlier lost to Western Australia. The teams were level at the start of the final set of matches, both teams winning their matches 5–2. New South Wales won in 1964 and 1965, winning all their matches both times. There was another tie in 1966 when Queensland and Victoria finished level with four wins and 21 individual match wins. Queensland beat New South Wales 4–3 in the final set of matches while Victoria beat South Australia 5–2. New South Wales won in 1967, despite losing their last match 5–2 to Victoria. Victoria had earlier lost to Western Australia, finishing with 22 individual wins to the 24 of New South Wales.

In 1968 the event was held in Tasmania for the first time and the hosts won all their matches to win the title for the first time. New South Wales won in 1969 and 1970, being undefeated in both years. Western Australia won for the first time in 1971, with Tasmania runners-up, the first time that neither New South Wales or Victoria had been in the top two. New South Wales had further wins in 1972 and 1973 but Tasmania won for a second time when the event return to Tasmania in 1974. There was another home winner in 1975 when South Australia had their first outright win since 1938. New South Wales continued to be the most successful state but after 1973 they wouldn't beat all the other five teams again until 1996. Tasmania won in 1977, their first success outside their home state, while Queensland won in 1979, their first outright win since 1948. From 1979, extra holes were dropped, matches level after 18 holes being halved. Victoria won in 1982, their first outright win since 1963, while South Australia won in 1983.

Foursomes matches were added in 1984. There were 4 foursomes matches in the morning with 7 singles in the afternoon, extending the event to 5 days. Western Australia won for the second time in 1984, finishing level with New South Wales with four wins out of five but with half a point more. They won again in 1988, after the final round of matches were abandoned because of rain. Between 1985 and 1996 the event was won by New South Wales 7 times and Victoria 4 times. Western Australia had further wins in 1997 and 1999 while Queensland won in 2001, 2004 and 2010.

The format was changed in 2011. The foursomes matches were dropped from the round-robin stage. There were 7 singles matches, meaning that two contests could be played each day. After the round-robin the top two teams played a final. In 2011 the final consisted of 4 foursomes and 8 singles. Queensland beat Victoria in the final, although Victoria had led the round-robin stage. In 2012 the foursomes were dropped completely, the final being just 8 singles matches. Northern Territory joined in 2015, increasing the number of rounds to seven, one team having a bye in each round. In 2017 New South Wales won all their round-robinmatches but lost to Victoria in the final. In 2018 the final between Victoria and Queensland was tied, Victoria winning the event as they had led the round-robin stage. Victoria won five times in six years from 2014 to 2019.

Results

RR– Team's score in the round-robin stage. Positions were determined by the number of team points and where that was equal by the number of individual match points.

From 1947 to 1983 each team match consisted of 7 singles matches, so that each team played a total of 35 individual matches. From 1984 to 2010 there were an additional 4 foursomes matches, increasing the number of individual matches to 55. In 1988 and 1992 one set of matches was not played because of rain, so that each team only played 4 other teams, with the number of individual matches reduced to 44. In 2001, two sets of foursomes matches were not played, reducing the number of individual matches to 47. In 2008, one set of foursomes matches was not played, reducing the number of individual matches to 51. In 2011 the foursomes were dropped, returning to the format used before 1984. However, a final was introduced between the leading two teams in the round-robin, to decide the winner of the event. Northern Territory joined in 2015, increasing the number of matches played by each team to 6, and individual matches to 42.

Source:

Appearances
The following are those who played in at least one of the matches.

New South Wales

Kevin Abrahamsen 1961
John Allerton 1947
Darin Anderson 2003
Eric Apperly 1906, 1911, 1912, 1920, 1921, 1922, 1923, 1924, 1925, 1926, 1927, 1928, 1929, 1930, 1931, 1932, 1933, 1935
Joshua Armstrong 2017, 2018, 2019
RT Armstrong 1920, 1921, 1925, 1927
Jamie Arnold 2005, 2006, 2007
Scott Arnold 2007, 2008
Jason Ashcroft 1995, 1996, 1997
RE Bailey 1912
Barry Baker 1964, 1965, 1966
Gordon Balcombe 1911, 1921, 1923, 1925, 1927, 1928
Ted Ball 1960
Nathan Barbieri 2018, 2019
Jack Barkel 1935, 1938, 1939, 1948, 1949, 1950, 1951, 1954, 1955
Kurt Barnes 2002, 2003
Chris Barrett 1987
Noel Bartell 1956, 1957, 1958, 1962, 1963, 1964, 1965, 1966
Geoff Barwick 1972
Lucas Bates 2002
Austin Bautista 2016
Darren Beck 2004
Maurice Behringer 1954, 1955
Owen Beldham 1973, 1974, 1975, 1976
George Bell 1971, 1972, 1975
Peter Bennett 1971
Vic Bennetts 1963, 1964, 1965, 1966
Wayne Berry 2004
Harry Berwick 1949, 1950, 1951, 1952, 1953, 1955, 1956, 1957, 1958, 1959, 1960, 1961, 1963, 1965, 1967, 1968, 1969, 1973
Reg Bettington 1926, 1928, 1931, 1932, 1934
Rudi Bezuidenhout 2005, 2006, 2007
Phil Billings 1957, 1958, 1959, 1960, 1961, 1962, 1963, 1964, 1965, 1967, 1968, 1969, 1970, 1971, 1972, 1974, 1982
Colin Bishop 1976, 1977
Paul Blake 2008, 2009
Rohan Blizard 2005, 2006, 2007, 2008
Arthur Bosch 1976, 1977, 1978, 1979, 1980, 1982
Bruce Boyle 1975
Clive Boyce 1921
Ian Bradley 1994, 1995
Stuart Bradshaw 1947
Dale Brandt-Richards 2013, 2014, 2015
David Bransdon 1993, 1994
Daniel Bringolf 2010, 2011, 2012
Dave Bromley 1974, 1982
Arthur N. Brown 1927
John Brown 1926
Mitchell Brown 2003, 2004, 2005
Robert Lee Brown 1928, 1933
Vic Bulgin 1959, 1960, 1961, 1962, 1965, 1966, 1967
Barry Burgess 1967, 1968, 1969
Chris Campbell 1999, 2000, 2001, 2002
Neptune Christoe 1905, 1906, 1907, 1908, 1909, 1912
Ben Clementson 2012
Dal Cockerill 1951
Lou Cohen 1938
Robert Colquhoun 1907
James Conran 2019
Steven Conran 1988, 1990
Bruce Cook 1973
Alan Cooper 1927
Eric Couper 1974, 1975, 1976, 1978, 1980, 1981, 1982, 1983
Gordon Craig 1904
Bruce Crampton 1953
Tony Crow 1964, 1965
Harrison Crowe 2018, 2019
Glen Cunneen 1954, 1955
John Curtis 1952
Roger Dannock 1987, 1988, 1989
Doug Davies 1937, 1939, 1946
Cameron Davis 2013, 2014, 2015, 2016
Bruce Devlin 1957, 1958, 1959, 1960
Warwick Dews 2000, 2001, 2002
Dick Dickson 1936
Tony Dight 1983, 1984
Bill Dobson 1931, 1933, 1934
Kevin Donohoe 1960, 1961, 1962, 1963, 1964, 1967, 1968, 1969, 1970, 1971
Adam Downton 2009
Brett Drewitt 2010, 2011, 2012, 2013
David Ecob 1986, 1987, 1988
Matthew Ecob 1989, 1990, 1991, 1992, 1993
Sam Egger 1993, 1997
Rob Elkington 1988, 1989, 1991, 1992, 1993, 1994
Brendan Ellam 1998, 1999, 2000
Kep Enderby 1946, 1947, 1948, 1949
Harrison Endycott 2015, 2016, 2017
Don Esplin 1939
Geoff Everett 1971, 1972
George Fawcett 1930, 1931, 1933
Ben Ferguson 1995, 1996
Jim Ferrier 1931, 1933, 1934, 1935, 1936, 1937, 1939
Nick Flanagan 2003
Jarrod Freeman 2014
Simon Furneaux 2003
Joshua Gadd 2018
Daniel Gale 2016
Richie Gallichan 2004, 2005, 2006, 2007
Scott Gardiner 1998, 1999
Jordie Garner 2018, 2019
Martin Geraghty 1979
Howard Giblin 1912
Matt Giles 2008
AO Gilles 1906
Ross Gore 1923
Paul Gow 1989, 1990, 1991, 1992, 1993
Jim Grant 1950, 1951
Kyle Grant 2009, 2011
Nathan Green 1995, 1996, 1997, 1998
Tony Gresham 1963, 1964, 1966, 1967, 1968, 1969, 1970, 1971, 1973, 1974, 1975, 1976, 1977, 1978, 1979, 1980, 1981, 1982
Joshua Grierson 2017, 2018
Henry Gritton 1923, 1924
Adam Groom 2000, 2001, 2002
Ron Hall 1972
Harry Hattersley 1929, 1930, 1931, 1932, 1933, 1935, 1936, 1937, 1946, 1947, 1948, 1949, 1950, 1951, 1952, 1953, 1954, 1955, 1957
Peter Headlam 1937, 1938
Peter Headland 1972, 1973, 1974, 1975
Peter Heard 1946, 1947, 1948, 1949, 1950, 1951, 1952, 1953, 1955, 1956, 1957, 1958, 1959
Jake Higginbottom 2010, 2011, 2012
Lucas Higgins 2019
George Holdship 1904, 1907
Mark Holland 1990, 1991, 1992
Ian Hood 1978, 1979, 1980, 1981, 1982
Colin Houghton 1977
Tom Howard 1920, 1921
Frank Hughes 1934
Luke Humphries 2009, 2011
Brendan Jones 1993, 1994, 1995, 1996, 1997, 1998
Philip Sydney Jones Jr. 1909, 1921, 1924, 1927, 1929
Philip Sydney Jones III 1929
Shannon Jones 2000, 2001, 2002
Ricky Kato 2012, 2013, 2014
Colin Kaye 1972, 1973, 1974, 1975, 1976, 1977, 1978, 1979, 1980, 1981, 1982, 1983
Stan Keane 1928, 1930
Jason King 1998, 1999, 2000, 2001
William Laidley 1911, 1912
Tristan Lambert 2005, 2006
Peter Langham 1954, 1956, 1958, 1959, 1960, 1961, 1962, 1964
Richard Lee 1977
Won Jon Lee 2004, 2005, 2006
Brad Lincoln 1985, 1986, 1993
Kurt Linde 1996, 1997, 1998
Col Lindsay 1979, 1981
Chris Longley 1978, 1981, 1983, 1984, 1987, 1988
Bryce MacDonald 1994, 1995, 1996, 1997
Hugh MacNeil 1904, 1905, 1908
Edward Bayly Macarthur 1904, 1905, 1909
Charles Mackenzie 1906, 1907, 1908, 1911
Lance Mason 1970
Jack McCarthy 1953, 1956, 1957
Henry McClelland 1920, 1922, 1924, 1925
Rhys McGovern 2010
Frank McGuinness 1929
Scott McGuinness 2003
Jack McIntosh 1936
Tom McKay 1932, 1934, 1935, 1937
Andrew McKenzie 2003, 2004
Ossie Meares 1920, 1922
Travis Merritt 2000
Stephen Moriarty 1994
Hector Morrison 1925, 1926, 1928, 1929, 1930, 1931, 1932, 1933, 1938
Troy Moses 2013, 2014, 2015
Frank Murdoch 1923, 1925, 1926
Bruce Nairn 1962
Mark Nash 1984, 1985
Jack Newton 1968, 1969
James Nitties 2002, 2003, 2004
Isaac Noh 2017
Oscar O'Brien 1905, 1906, 1907, 1908, 1909, 1911, 1912
Brett Ogle 1984, 1985
Peter O'Malley 1985, 1986
Callan O'Reilly 2012, 2013
Albert Padfield 1909
Dimitrios Papadatos 2011, 2012
Lucas Parsons 1989, 1990, 1991, 1992
Lee Patterson 1956
Robert Payne 2001
Clyde Pearce 1908
Jim Pendergast 1946, 1947, 1948
Dylan Perry 2016, 2017
Brayden Petersen 2014, 2015
Lester Peterson 1984, 1985, 1986, 1987, 1988, 1989, 1990, 1991, 1992, 1993, 1994, 1995, 1996, 1997, 1998, 1999, 2005
Ray Picker 1984, 1985, 1986
Jye Pickin 2019
Keith Pix 1951, 1952, 1953, 1954, 1955, 1958
Edward Pope 1921
Ewan Porter 2001
John Powell 1953, 1955
Gerry Power 1980, 1981, 1982, 1983, 1984, 1985, 1986, 1987
George Proud 1932
Michael Raseta 2008, 2009, 2010
Barry Ratcliffe 1954
Noel Ratcliffe 1970, 1971, 1973
Claude Reading 1909, 1911, 1922
Andrew Richards 2018
Ted Rigney 1946, 1956
John Rixon 1987
Justin Roach 2006, 2007
Charles Rundle 1911, 1920, 1922, 1923, 1926, 1930, 1932, 1935, 1936
Grant Scott 2007, 2008
JRD Scott 1924
Don Sharp 1966, 1968, 1969
Paul Sheehan 1996, 1997, 1998, 1999
Ted Simpson 1904, 1905, 1906, 1907, 1908
Harry Sinclair 1922, 1923, 1924, 1925
Rory Slade 1978, 1979, 1983
Brendan Smith 2008, 2009
Clive Nigel Smith 1924, 1926, 1927, 1929, 1930, 1935, 1936
Matthew Smith 1999
Thomas Smith 1912
Michael Smyth 2009, 2010
Travis Smyth 2014, 2015, 2016, 2017
Ruben Sondjaja 2013
Dan Soutar 1904
Arthur Spooner 1938
Edward Stedman 1999
Henry Stephen 1924
Tim Stewart 2006, 2007, 2008
Wayne Stewart 1987, 1988, 1989, 1990, 1991, 1992
Matt Stieger 2010, 2011
Les Stuart 1939
Walter Sturrock 1920, 1922, 1928
Brad Sullivan 1983
Richard Swift 2000, 2001, 2002
Tom Tanner 1938, 1939, 1948, 1949
Gordon Thomson 1937, 1950, 1952, 1953
Mark Thomson 2004
Lincoln Tighe 2009, 2010, 2011
Bill Tobin 1966, 1967
DM Tooth 1927
Des Turner 1961, 1962, 1965, 1966, 1967, 1968, 1969, 1970
Danny Vera 1994
Noel Wade 1959, 1961, 1963
Jeff Wagner 1983, 1986
Bob Wallace 1970
LG Warren 1927
Barry Warren 1954, 1956, 1957, 1958, 1959, 1960
Craig Warren 1984, 1985, 1986
Justin Warren 2015
Alan Waterson 1934, 1937, 1939, 1946, 1947, 1948, 1951
PC Watson 1936
Norman Weeks 1949, 1950, 1952, 1953
Charles White 1904
Rob Whitlock 1991, 1992
Richmond Whytt 1904, 1905
Rob Willis 1988, 1989, 1990
Blake Windred 2016, 2017, 2018, 2019
Doug Witham 1976, 1977
Bob Withycombe 1934, 1938
Phil Wood 1970, 1972, 1973, 1974, 1975, 1976, 1977, 1978, 1979, 1980
Trevor Wood 1971
Graydon Woolridge 1995
William Wright 1962, 1963
Kevin Yuan 2015, 2016, 2017
Jordan Zunic 2012, 2013, 2014

Northern Territory
Northern Territory first competed in 2015.

Alex Brennan 2017, 2018, 2019
Daniel Brown 2015
John Croker 2018
Jaryd Grant 2017
Mitchell Gridley 2015, 2016, 2017
Peter Hargreaves 2015, 2019
Thomas Harold 2018
Kerryn Heaver 2015, 2016, 2017, 2018, 2019
William Hetherington 2015
Jake Hughes 2015, 2016, 2017, 2018, 2019
Robert Miller 2016, 2017, 2018
Lachlan Morgan 2019
Malcolm Roney 2018, 2019
Terence Serventy 2017, 2018
Leigh Shacklady 2015, 2016, 2019
Brad Stankiewicz 2016
Mark Steven 2015
Benjamin Steven 2019
Rex Williamson 2016
George Worrall 2016, 2017

Queensland
Queensland first competed in 1925 and played again in 1928, 1931, 1936, 1937 and 1938. They played in all events from 1946.

D Anderson 1996
Eric Anning 1925, 1928
Maverick Antcliff 2011
Tom Arnott 1999, 2000
Richard Backwell 1984, 1985
Viraat Badhwar 2013
Matt Ballard 1999, 2000, 2001
D Barnes 1989, 1990
J Barton 1970, 1972, 1973
Marika Batibasaga 2007, 2010
Ray Beaufils 2005, 2006, 2007, 2008
Rowan Beste 2003
Kunal Bhasin 2006
Ben Bloomfield 2003, 2004
Adam Blyth 2003, 2004
Stuart Bouvier 1987, 1988, 1989
Steven Bowditch 2000, 2001
Clive Boyce 1925, 1928, 1931
William Boyce 1925, 1928, 1931
Adam Boyer 2009, 2010
J Brook 1925, 1928
Robbie Brook 1992, 1993, 1994, 1995
L Brown 1975
S Brown 1993, 1994, 1995, 1996, 1997, 1998
Andrew Buckle 2001, 2002
Richard Buczynsky 1991, 1992, 1993, 1994
Marcus Cain 1994
Kurt Carlson 2005
A Carrick 1959
Keith Cashman 1965, 1966
Glen Cogill 1972, 1974, 1975, 1976, 1977, 1978, 1979, 1980, 1981, 1982, 1983, 1984
Lochie Coleborn 2019
Alex Colledge 1936, 1937, 1938, 1946, 1947, 1948, 1949, 1952, 1953, 1955, 1956, 1957, 1958
Jared Consoli 2009
Dick Coogan 1946, 1948, 1949, 1952, 1953, 1954, 1955, 1960, 1961, 1964, 1966, 1967, 1968, 1969
Jack Coogan 1946, 1948, 1949, 1951, 1952, 1953, 1955, 1959, 1960
Steven Cox 2016
Christopher Crabtree 2017, 2019
Doug Cranstoun 1958, 1960
Cory Crawford 2014, 2015
Robert Cumming 1928, 1931
Peter Dagan 1983, 1984
Charlie Dann 2016, 2017, 2018
B Davies 1992
Peter Davies 1952, 1953, 1954, 1955, 1957, 1958, 1959, 1960, 1961, 1962, 1963, 1964, 1965, 1966, 1968, 1969
Ian Davis 1974, 1975, 1976
Tom Davis 2002, 2003, 2004, 2005
Jason Day 2004, 2005
Louis Dobbelaar 2017, 2018, 2019
Andrew Dodt 2003, 2004, 2005, 2006, 2007
Paul Donahoo 2005, 2006
Chris Downes 1999, 2000
Keith Drage 1948, 1954, 1956, 1957, 1958, 1959, 1960, 1962, 1963, 1964, 1965, 1966, 1967, 1968, 1969, 1970, 1971, 1972
Andrew Duffin 2001, 2002
Roley Duncan 1946, 1947
Lee Eagleton 1991, 1992, 1993, 1994, 1995
Alan Eaves 1975, 1981, 1982
John Ebenston 1970, 1971, 1972, 1973, 1974, 1975, 1976
Henry Epstein 2000
Colin Esdaile 1931
Gavin Fairfax 2008, 2009, 2010
Don Fardon Sr 1983
Don Fardon Jr 1983
Don Fardon 1982, 1984, 1986, 1987, 1988, 1989, 1990
Edward Fitzpatrick 1928
Gavin Flint 2002, 2003, 2004
Lawry Flynn 2017, 2018, 2019
Paul Foley 1976
Stan Francis 1928, 1937
Chris Fraser 1985
Doug Gardner 1988, 1989, 1990, 1991, 1992, 1993, 1994
Dylan Gardner 2018, 2019
Adam Gemmell 2007, 2010
James Gibellini 2011, 2012, 2013
Budge Gill 1936, 1947, 1950
Len Gillander 1954
David Gleeson 1995, 1996, 1997, 1998
Theo Godsell 1949
Wayne Grady 1977
David Grenfell 1995
Matthew Guyatt 1996, 1997, 1998, 1999
Peter Hall 2008
Ryan Haller 1998, 1999
Ian Handley 1954, 1955, 1956, 1957
Peter Harrington 1991
Chris Harrop 2012
Tim Hart 2008, 2009, 2010, 2011
John Hay 1965, 1966, 1967, 1968, 1969, 1970, 1971, 1978, 1979
Claude Henry 1936
Doug Hertrick 1964
Ron Hertrick 1966, 1967, 1968, 1969, 1970, 1971, 1972, 1973, 1974
Lucas Higgins 2017
Lewis Hoath 2019
David Hoger 1973, 1975
L Holmes 1983
Ray Howarth 1938, 1948, 1949, 1950, 1951, 1952, 1953, 1954, 1956
Harry Howes 1947
Thomas Brown Hunter 1931
Paul Jackman 1961, 1962, 1963, 1964, 1965
D Jenkins 1977, 1978, 1983
Ross Jenkinson 1936, 1937, 1938
Travis Johns 1997, 1998
Garth Johnstone 1962, 1963, 1964
C Jones 1991, 1992, 1993, 1994
L Jones 1925
C Joyce 1987, 1988
G Joyce 1936
Jody Kaggelis 1996
Stan Keane 1937, 1946, 1948
Troy Kennedy 2000
Joe Kiernan 1970
Matthew King 1985, 1986, 1987, 1988, 1989
Douglas Klein 2016, 2017, 2018
Kelvin Kroh 1985
Bronson La'Cassie 2002
C Lindsay 1982, 1984
J Lynch 1993
Taylor MacDonald 2011, 2012, 2013, 2014, 2015
Sommie Mackay 1957, 1958, 1959, 1960, 1961, 1963, 1964, 1965, 1966, 1967, 1968, 1969, 1970
T MacLean 1980
Justin Maker 2003, 2004, 2005, 2006
L Maker 1959
Kevin Marques 2011, 2012, 2013
Matthew McBain 2007, 2008
Kade McBride 2014
Daniel McGraw 2012
Blake McGrory 2007, 2009, 2010
Jake McLeod 2013, 2014, 2015
John Miller 1938
Richard Moir 1999, 2000, 2001, 2002, 2003
C Moore 1925
Ossie Moore 1977, 1978, 1979, 1981, 1982
D Morgan 1995, 1996, 1997, 1998, 1999
Jediah Morgan 2017, 2018, 2019
Alan Morrow 1938
B Munn 1958
Mark Nash 1979, 1980, 1981
Simon Nash 2000
Daniel Nisbet 2007, 2008, 2009, 2011, 2012
Greg Norman 1973, 1974
Bernie O'Sullivan 1950, 1951, 1952, 1953
Jon O'Sullivan 2001, 2002
Harry Oberg 1947
M Officer 1984
Dylan Perry 2018
Wayne Perske 1997, 1998, 1999
Aaron Pike 2006
Charles Pilon 2016
Ben Pisani 2004, 2005
David Podlich 1989, 1990
Trevor Poetschka 1986
Barney Porter 1956, 1957, 1958, 1960, 1961, 1962, 1963, 1964, 1967, 1968, 1971
T Power 1982
Blake Proverbs 2015, 2016
Anthony Quayle 2014, 2015, 2016
Jack Radcliffe 1925, 1936
Brett Rankin 2006, 2007, 2008, 2009, 2010
Jack Rayner 1951, 1954, 1955, 1956, 1957, 1961, 1966
D Richards 1992
J Riley 1997, 1998
M Roberts 1988, 1989, 1990
J Rogers 1993
Greg Rowe 1985, 1986
Mark Sanford 1984
Alf Scanlan 1950
V Scott 1971
Jeff Senior 1976, 1977, 1978, 1979, 1980, 1981, 1982
Peter Senior 1976, 1977, 1978
Derek Shirlaw 1990, 1991
Cameron Smith 2010, 2011, 2012, 2013
Mitchell Smith 2016
Scott Smith 2008
Phil Soegaard 1991
Bill Somers 1949
Danny Spencer 1974, 1975, 1976, 1977, 1978, 1979, 1980, 1981
Joel Stahlhut 2019
Bill Stanley 1938, 1946, 1950, 1956
Jack Sullivan 2014, 2015
W Sullivan 1931
Shane Tait 1987, 1990
Stephen Taylor 1985, 1986, 1987
Steve Thompson 2009
Mark Tickle 1980, 1981, 1983, 1986, 1987
Graham Tippett 1962, 1967, 1969, 1970, 1972, 1973, 1979, 1980
Drew Tovey 1971
Geoff Townson 1947, 1949, 1950, 1951
Ian Triggs 1972
Gerry Trude 1937
George Twemlow 1936, 1937
Nathan Uebergang 2006
Randall Vines 1961, 1962
Simon Viitakangas 2013, 2014, 2015
Dudley von Nida 1937, 1938, 1946, 1950, 1959
Ian Walker 2001, 2002
Peter Wardrop 1971, 1972, 1973, 1974, 1975, 1976, 1977, 1978, 1979, 1980
Mick Weston 1955, 1963
Noel Weston 1947, 1948, 1949, 1951, 1952, 1953, 1954, 1955, 1956, 1957, 1959, 1960, 1961, 1963, 1969
R Weston 1965
George Whatmore 1931
Roy White 1947, 1948, 1950, 1951, 1952, 1953
Shaun Wiggett 1993, 1994, 1995, 1996
Aaron Wilkin 2012, 2013, 2014
Alan Wilson 1981
Bill Wishart 1951, 1958, 1965
Chris Witcher 1973, 1974
Chris Wood 2010, 2011
Kyle Woodbine 1995, 1996, 1997
Shae Wools-Cobb 2015, 2016, 2017, 2018
Gary Wright 1967
T Wright 1991, 1992
Mark Wuersching 2001
Peter Wuoti 1982, 1983, 1984, 1985
Peter Zidar 1986, 1987, 1988, 1989, 1990
Zoran Zorkic 1985, 1986, 1988

South Australia

Bill Ackland-Horman 1932, 1935, 1937, 1938, 1939, 1947, 1948, 1949, 1950, 1951, 1952, 1953, 1954, 1955, 1956, 1957, 1958, 1959, 1962
William Ackland-Horman Sr. 1921
Luke Altschwager 1997, 1998
Max Anderson 1907
Colin Angel 1968, 1969, 1970, 1971
George Anstey 1905, 1907
Leigh Attenborough 1996, 1998
Chris Austin 2005, 2006, 2007, 2008, 2009, 2010, 2011, 2013
Julian Ayers 1905
John Baker 1910, 1912, 1913
Timothy Baker 2012, 2013
Lachlan Barker 2015, 2016, 2017
Earn Barritt 1909, 1910, 1913
Kevin Bartsch 1975
Shane Baxter 2003, 2004, 2005
Hugh Bell 1912, 1913
Hugh Bell 1970, 1972, 1973
Ben Bert 1996, 1997, 1998, 1999, 2000, 2001, 2002
Adam Bland 2002, 2003, 2004
Greg Blewett 2012
Tom Bond 2009, 2010, 2011, 2012
Chris Bonython 1971, 1972, 1973, 1974, 1975, 1976, 1977, 1978
Geoff Brennan 1999
Wayne Bridgman 1970
Chris Brown 2007, 2008, 2009, 2010, 2011, 2012, 2013
E Bruce 1913
Jack Buchanan 2018, 2019
Kevin Bulbeck 1982, 1983, 1984
G Burns 1994
Samuel Burton 2017
Darrell Cahill 1967, 1968, 1969, 1989
Billy Cawthorne 2017, 2018, 2019
Brendan Chant 1995, 1996, 1997, 1998
Phillip Chapman 1990, 1991, 1992, 1993, 1994, 1995, 1996
Tom Cheadle 1908, 1923, 1926, 1929, 1932
David Cherry 1966, 1967, 1968, 1969, 1971, 1973, 1974, 1975, 1976, 1977, 1978, 1979, 1980, 1981, 1982, 1983, 1987
Bob Christie 1936, 1937, 1938, 1939, 1947, 1949
Sam Christie 1975, 1976, 1979
Dave Cleland 1950, 1951, 1957, 1958, 1959, 1960, 1961, 1962, 1963, 1966, 1967
Jamie Clutterham 2000, 2001
Colin Coleman 2018
Peter Cooke 2002, 2003, 2004, 2005, 2006, 2007
Justin Cooper 1992, 1993, 1994, 1995
James Coulson 1987, 1988, 1989, 1992, 1993, 1994
William Cowell 1909, 1910
Neil Crafter 1980, 1981, 1982, 1983, 1984, 1985, 1986, 1987, 1988, 1989, 1990, 1991, 1992
Roy Crook 1935, 1937, 1939
Brett Crosby 1991, 1993, 1994, 1995, 1996, 1997, 1998
Justin Crowder 2014
Nick Cullen 2006, 2007, 2008
Max Dale 1959, 1962, 1968, 1970
W Davies 1908
Craig Davis 2003
Dick Destree 1948, 1949, 1950, 1951, 1952, 1954, 1955
Gordon Dick 1967
James Dudley 2001
Bob Duval 1953, 1954, 1958, 1959, 1960, 1965, 1968
Alan Dye 1929
Sam Earl 2015, 2016
Brian Ferris 1954, 1956, 1961, 1962
Rod Follett 1971
Dick Foot 1950, 1951, 1953, 1954, 1955, 1957, 1958, 1959, 1960, 1961
Bob Forbes 1921, 1923, 1926, 1927
Louis Fuller 2004, 2005, 2006
CL Gardiner 1907
Liam Georgiadis 2016, 2018, 2019
Digby Giles 1923, 1924, 1930
Tony Gover 1972
Andrew Grzybowski 2009
Bill Gunson 1905, 1907, 1908, 1910, 1912, 1924
Bill Guy 1983, 1984, 1985, 1990, 1991
Ben Hallam 2004, 2007
Herbert Hambleton 1924
Robert Hammer 2000, 2001
Deane Harris 1982, 1983, 1984, 1986
Michael Harris 1999
SD Harris 1946
Mike Haslett 1981, 1982, 1983, 1984, 1985, 1986, 1994
D Hatwell 1966
Les Haupt 1957
RJ Hawkes 1909
Joshua Hayes 2015, 2018
Ian Hayward 1927, 1930
Kari Heikkonen 1979, 1980, 1981, 1982
Ian Henderson 1984, 1985, 1986, 1987, 1988
Alex Hendrick 2008, 2010, 2011
Joseph Hodgson 2017
Peter Howard 1964, 1965, 1966, 1968, 1969, 1970, 1971, 1972, 1973, 1974, 1975, 1976, 1977, 1978, 1981
Ryan Hunter 2000
Glen Hutton 1936
Tony Hutton 1962, 1963, 1964, 1965, 1966, 1967, 1968, 1969
D Jay 1964, 1965
Glenn Jewell 1999
Andrew Johnson 1999, 2000, 2001, 2002, 2003, 2004
Edmund Britten Jones 1924
Glenn Joyner 1985, 1986, 1987
Jackson Kalz 2017, 2018
Graham Keane 1954, 1955, 1956, 1957, 1959, 1967
W Kelly 1930
Nathan Kent 2000, 2001, 2002
Vern Kingshott 1959, 1960, 1961, 1962, 1963, 1965, 1966, 1967
Stuart Kopania 1999, 2005
Matt Lane 1996, 1997, 1998
Ben Layton 2016, 2019
Edward Leaver 1913, 1921
Matthew Lisk 2014, 2015, 2016, 2017
David Lutterus 2002, 2003, 2004, 2005
JA Macdonald 1910, 1912, 1913
John Maddern 1959, 1960
Troy Manhire 2001
Sam Masters 2011
Max McCardle 2008, 2009, 2010
Andrew McCarthy 2006
Paul McDonald 1995
J McDowall 1974
Glen McGough 1997
Dick McKay 1963, 1964
Alec McLachlan 1932, 1933, 1935
Ian McLachlan 1930, 1949
Campbell McLuckie 1991, 1992, 1993
Bob Mesnil 1962, 1963, 1964
Mark Milbank 1980
Douglas Moody 1933
Brad Moules 2010, 2011, 2012
John Muller 1974, 1975, 1976, 1977, 1978, 1979
Anthony Murdaca 2010, 2011, 2012, 2013, 2014, 2015
John Myers 1963, 1964, 1965, 1968, 1969
Andrew Nakone 2017
Noel Neumann 1952
S Nichol 1993
Bryan Nolte 1956
Harry Nott 1923, 1924, 1926, 1927, 1932, 1933, 1939
Jordan Ormsby 1996
Wade Ormsby 1997
Cyril Ostler 1958, 1960, 1961, 1962, 1963
Bill Parsons 1923, 1926, 1927
Leslie Penfold Hyland 1905, 1907, 1908, 1910
Adrian Percey 1990, 1991, 1992, 1993, 1994, 1995
Henry Perks 2002, 2003
Sylv Phelan 1946
Don Phillis 1946
R Pope 1987, 1989, 1990
Scott Ready 2014, 2016
Peter Reid 1946
Michael Richards 1976, 1977, 1978
Andrew Richardson 1995, 1996, 1997, 1998, 1999, 2000, 2001, 2002
Jack Richardson 1947
Heath Riches 2012, 2013, 2014, 2015, 2016
Jacob Rillotta 2019
Phil Roberts 1979, 1980, 1981, 1982, 1983, 1984, 1985, 1986, 1987, 1988, 1990, 1991, 1992
Shane Robinson 1985, 1986, 1987, 1988, 1989
Jarrad Roxby 2005, 2006, 2007, 2011
Don Rutherford 1952, 1955, 1965, 1966
Bill Rymill 1929, 1930, 1932, 1933, 1935, 1936, 1937, 1938, 1948, 1949, 1951, 1952, 1953, 1954, 1956
Herbert Rymill 1905, 1912, 1921
Ross Sawers 1926, 1927, 1929, 1930, 1932, 1933, 1935, 1936, 1938, 1939
Alfred Scarfe 1907, 1908, 1909, 1912
Andreas Schleicher 1988, 1989, 1990
Peter Scovell 1964, 1965, 1966, 1970
Gordon Seddon 1939, 1947, 1948, 1950, 1951
Darryl Sellar 1989, 1990
Don Sharp 1971
Charles Shaw 2013
Bill Shephard 1947, 1948, 1950, 1951, 1953, 1955, 1957, 1958, 1960, 1961, 1962
Cody Sherratt 2004
Jordan Sherratt 2005, 2006, 2007, 2008, 2009, 2010
Gary Simpson 1991, 1992, 1993, 1994
W Simpson 1971, 1972, 1973
Stanley Skipper 1924
Brad Smith 2003
Jamie Smith 2019
Walter Law Smith 1912, 1913, 1921
William Somerfield 2014, 2015, 2016, 2017
Paul Spargo 1999
Daniel Speirs 2009
Stephen Speirs 2006, 2007, 2008, 2009
Nigel Spence 2000
Rex Spong 1937
Mike Sprengel 1985, 1986
Bob Stevens 1946, 1947, 1948, 1949, 1950, 1951, 1952, 1953, 1955, 1956, 1958, 1960, 1961, 1962, 1963
Graham Stevens 1972, 1973, 1974, 1978, 1979, 1980, 1981, 1988, 1989
Robert Still 1964, 1967
Guy Stirling 1909, 1910
Benjamin Stowe 2013, 2014
Brian Swift 1921, 1923, 1924
Harry Swift 1905, 1908, 1909
Jack Tanner 2019
Jack Thompson 2018, 2019
L Thompson 1973, 1974
Harry Thredgold 1935, 1938, 1951, 1953
David Threlfall 1972, 1973, 1974, 1977, 1978, 1979
Lindsay Toms 1927, 1929
Alf Toogood 1926
Rupert Tucker 1929
Ben Tuohy 1995, 1998
Bob Tuohy 1956, 1957, 1958
Dudley Turner 1933, 1936, 1937
Frank Vucic 2018
Mel Warner 1956
Chris Whitford 1969, 1970, 1975, 1976, 1977, 1978, 1979, 1980, 1988, 2002
Adrian Wickstein 2008
Dean Wiles 1969, 1970, 1971, 1972, 1975, 1976, 1977, 1980, 1981, 1982, 1983, 1984
John Wilkin 1948, 1949, 1950, 1952, 1953, 1954, 1955, 1957
Jack Williams 2012, 2013, 2014, 2015
Legh Winser 1921, 1923, 1926, 1927, 1929, 1930, 1932, 1933, 1936, 1938, 1946
Harold Wright 1935, 1936, 1937, 1938, 1939, 1946, 1947, 1948, 1949

Tasmania
Tasmania first entered in 1907 and competed a number of times up to 1930, generally when it was held in Melbourne. After 1930 they didn't enter a team again until 1947.

David Allanby 1996, 1997, 1998, 1999, 2000, 2001, 2002, 2003
J Allen 1959, 1962
Henry Allport 1925
Thomas Archer Jr. 1909, 1912, 1924
Thomas Archer Sr. 1907, 1909
Raynor Arthur 1912
Reg Ashbarry 1947, 1948, 1949, 1950, 1951, 1952, 1955, 1956
Tony Bailey 1983
Rex Barnes 1959, 1960, 1961
Lance Baynton 1950, 1953
Paul Beard 1977, 1978, 1979, 1980, 1981, 1982
Cameron Bell 2014, 2015
Allan Birchmore 1963
Roy Bishop 1950
Matthew Blackburn 1988, 1989, 1995, 1996
Bradley Bone 1994, 1995, 1996, 1997, 1998, 1999, 2000
Andrew Bonsey 2000
Elliott Booth 1962, 1963, 1964, 1965, 1966, 1968, 1970, 1972, 1973, 1974, 1975, 1976, 1977, 1978, 1979, 1980, 1981, 1982, 1983, 1984, 1985, 1986, 1987, 1988, 1989, 1990, 1991, 1992
Lionel Bowditch 1947, 1948, 1949, 1950, 1951, 1952, 1953, 1954, 1955, 1956, 1957, 1958
Joey Bower 2019
Kevin Brain 1984, 1986
Peter Brown 1930, 1947, 1948, 1949, 1950, 1951, 1952, 1953, 1954, 1955, 1956, 1957
Terence Brown 1928, 1930
R Bull 1925
Don Cameron 1960, 1961, 1963, 1964, 1965, 1966, 1967, 1969, 1970, 1971, 1972, 1974, 1975, 1976, 1977, 1978, 1979, 1980, 1981, 1982, 1983, 1984, 1985, 1986, 1987, 1988
Jack Carswell 2007
Phil Cartledge 1954
John Cassidy 1999, 2000, 2001, 2002, 2003, 2004, 2005, 2006, 2007, 2008, 2009, 2010, 2011, 2012, 2013
Craig Christie 1999
David Constable 1925, 1930
Michael Craw 1982
Cory Crawford 2011, 2012
Leonard Cuff 1907, 1909, 1912, 1921
Ellis Davies 1928
Tim D'Emden 1980, 1981, 1982
Aaron Dobson 2014
George Fawcett 1912
Tom Field 1928
Shane French 1988, 1989, 1990
J Gardiner 1961
Nathan Gatehouse 2010, 2011, 2012, 2013, 2014, 2015, 2016, 2017, 2018
Phillip Glass 1981, 1988
Mathew Goggin 1993, 1994, 1995
David Good 1966, 1967, 1968, 1969
Duncan Grant 1963, 1964, 1965, 1966, 1967, 1968, 1969, 1970, 1974
Herbert Grant 1925
Stuart Gray 2002, 2003
Ian Grimsey 1965, 1971, 1972
Don Halliwell 1963, 1964
Alex Hamilton 2011
Craig Hancock 2003, 2004, 2005, 2006, 2007, 2008, 2009, 2017, 2018, 2019
Garry Harper 1980
Sean Harris 2004, 2005, 2006
Eustace Headlam 1912, 1924
Felix Headlam 1924, 1925, 1928, 1930
Anthony Heazlewood 2001
Andrew Hill 1978, 1981, 1982, 1983, 1984, 1985, 1987, 1990, 1991, 1992, 1993, 1994
Robin Hodgetts 1995, 1996, 1997, 1999, 2001, 2002, 2003, 2004
Jonathan Isles 1993, 1994, 1995, 1996, 1997, 1998, 1999, 2000, 2001, 2002
Brett Johns 1981, 1982, 1983, 1984, 1985, 1986, 1987, 1988, 1990, 1991, 1992, 1993
M Johns 1984
William Johnstone 1907
Dudley Jones 1953
Andrew Kamaric 2004, 2005, 2006
Mervyn Kay 1970, 1971, 1976, 1977
Richard Kube 2010, 2013, 2017, 2018
Michael Leedham 1974, 1975, 1976, 1979, 1983, 1984, 1985, 1986, 1987, 1988, 1989, 1990, 1991, 1992, 1993, 1994
Norman Lockhart 1924
Errol Lohrey 1989, 1990, 1991, 1992, 1993, 1994, 1995, 1996, 1997
Greg Longmore 2008, 2009, 2013, 2015, 2016, 2019
Steven Lucas 1991, 1992
Ken Maroney 1949, 1950, 1951, 1952, 1953, 1954
Paul Marshall 1992, 1994, 1995, 1996, 1998, 2007, 2008
Steven Mathew 2005
Noel Matthews 1947, 1948, 1949
P Matthews 1972, 1973
Harry May 1960, 1961
Andrew McCarthy 2003, 2004, 2005, 2013, 2014
Ryan McCarthy 2007, 2008, 2009, 2010, 2011, 2012
Bruce McClure 1964, 1965, 1966, 1967
W McPherson 1965
Josh Molendyk 2015
Dennis Mulcahy 1958, 1962
John Munnings 1956
Len Nettlefold 1921, 1924, 1925, 1928, 1930, 1947, 1948, 1949
Robert Nettlefold 1921, 1924, 1925, 1928, 1930
Arthur O'Connor 1907
Roy O'Connor 1907, 1909
Warwick Page 2000, 2001
Brett Partridge 1991, 1992, 1993, 1994, 1995, 1996
Rupert Paton 1921, 1930
Bruce Pearce 1909, 1912
Clyde Pearce 1907, 1909
Duane Penney 1997, 1998
Andrew Phillips 1998, 1999, 2000, 2010, 2011, 2012, 2013, 2014, 2015, 2016, 2017, 2018, 2019
Gerald Potter 1921, 1924
David Pretyman 1989, 1990
Gary Purdon 1975
James Pyke 2003, 2004, 2005, 2006, 2007, 2009
James Ramsay 2002
John Ramsay 1921
Sam Rawlings 2012, 2013, 2014, 2015, 2016
Paul Read 2016, 2017, 2018, 2019
Jason Reynolds 2006
Clint Rice 2001, 2002
Kalem Richardson 2008, 2009, 2010
Jonathan Ricks 1997
Adam Ring 2006, 2007, 2008, 2009, 2010
Max Robison 1970, 1971, 1972, 1973, 1974, 1975, 1976, 1977, 1978, 1979, 1980, 1983
Matthew Rose 2011, 2012
Bruce Saunders 1952, 1953, 1955
Mark Schulze 2004, 2005, 2006, 2007, 2008, 2009, 2010, 2011, 2012, 2013, 2014, 2015, 2016, 2017, 2018, 2019
Athol Shephard 1957, 1958, 1959, 1960, 1962, 1965, 1966
John Shield 1957, 1958
Gary Smith 1987, 1988
Hugh Smith 1921, 1928
Elijah Stanley 2017
Colin Stott 1972, 1973, 1974, 1975, 1976, 1977
Roy Stott 1951, 1952, 1953, 1954, 1955, 1956, 1957, 1958, 1959, 1961, 1962, 1963, 1968, 1969
M Sullivan 1989
Ryan Thomas 2018, 2019
Reginald Thorold 1912
Doug Thorp 1967, 1968, 1969, 1970, 1971, 1972, 1973, 1975, 1978, 1979, 1980, 1985, 1986
Laurie Thyne 1947
Anthony Toogood 1997, 1998
John Toogood 1951, 1952, 1953, 1954, 1955, 1956, 1957, 1958, 1959, 1960, 1961, 1962, 1963, 1964, 1967, 1968, 1969, 1971
Peter Toogood 1948, 1949, 1950, 1951, 1952, 1954, 1955, 1956, 1957, 1958, 1959, 1960, 1962, 1964, 1966, 1967, 1968, 1969, 1970, 1971, 1972, 1973, 1974, 1976, 1977, 1978, 1979, 1980
Jack Tregaskisjago 2014, 2016
Des Turner 1957, 1958, 1959, 1960
Mitch Van Noord 2015, 2016, 2017, 2018, 2019
Jason Wagner 1998, 1999, 2000, 2001, 2002, 2003
Phillip Watson 1985, 1986, 1987
Mike Wellington 1961, 1962, 1963
Bill Wellington 1964, 1965, 1966, 1967, 1968, 1969, 1970, 1971, 1973, 1974, 1975, 1976, 1977, 1978, 1979, 1981, 1982, 1983, 1984, 1985, 1986, 1987
Neil Wells 1973
Peter Westfield 1989, 1990
John Willing 1947, 1948, 1949, 1950, 1951, 1954
David Willis 1991, 1993
Ron Winnett 1959, 1960

Victoria

Jon Abbott 2003, 2005
Barton Adams 1925, 1934
Greg Alexander 1979
Stephen Allan 1993, 1994, 1995
Robert Allenby 1989, 1990, 1991
HB Anderson 1934, 1938
Stuart Appleby 1991, 1992
David Armstrong 1991, 1992, 1993
Doug Bachli 1946, 1947, 1948, 1949, 1950, 1951, 1952, 1953, 1955, 1956, 1957, 1958, 1959, 1960, 1962, 1963, 1964
Aaron Baddeley 1998, 1999
William Bailey 1926
John Baillieu 1938, 1946, 1947
Glenn Beckett 1998
Daniel Beckmann 2007, 2008, 2009, 2010
John Beveridge 1990, 1991, 1992
Luke Bleumink 2007, 2008, 2009, 2010
Bill Bosley 1969
Marcus Both 2000, 2001, 2002
Rory Bourke 2009, 2010, 2011, 2012
Ken Boyd 1984
Clyde Boyer 1975, 1976, 1977, 1978, 1979, 1980, 1982, 1984, 1985
Paul Bray 1981
S Brentnall 1910
Darcy Brereton 2018, 2019
David Briggs 1984
Bill Britten 1964, 1965, 1966, 1967, 1968, 1969, 1970, 1971, 1972, 1973, 1974, 1975
Norman Brookes 1904, 1906, 1908, 1911, 1912, 1913
Anthony Brown 2001, 2002
Bob Brown 1946, 1947, 1948
William Bruce 1905, 1907
Bob Bull 1952, 1953, 1954, 1956, 1957, 1959
Fred Bulte 1927, 1928, 1929, 1930, 1933
Ben Bunny 2002, 2003
Lachlan Cain 2010, 2011
Henry Callaway 1904, 1905, 1907, 1908
Matt Carver 1992
Rob Castles 1982, 1983, 1984, 1985
Konrad Ciupek 2019
Mike Clayton 1976, 1977, 1978, 1979, 1980
Darren Cole 1980
Brett Coletta 2015, 2016
Blake Collyer 2017, 2018, 2019
Matthew Costigan 1999
Roger Cowan 1965, 1966, 1967, 1968, 1969, 1970, 1971, 1972
Darryl Cox 1953
L Craig 1925
Jamie Crow 2005, 2006
Tom Crow 1952, 1953, 1954, 1955, 1957, 1959, 1960, 1961, 1962, 1963
Sydney Dalrymple 1932, 1935
Jason Dawes 1993, 1994
Leigh Deagan 2007
David Diaz 1987, 1989
Aiden Didone 2019
CE Dodge 1913
Kevin Donohoe 1965
David Doughton 1948
FM Douglass 1904
Geoff Drakeford 2011, 2012, 2013, 2014
Frazer Droop 2015
Laurie Duffy 1935, 1936, 1939, 1948, 1949, 1951
Lee Eagleton 1996
Ben Eccles 2013, 2014, 2015
Bill Edgar 1927, 1928, 1930, 1932, 1933, 1935, 1936, 1937, 1939, 1946, 1947, 1948, 1949, 1950, 1951, 1952, 1953, 1956, 1957
Frederick Fairbairn 1905, 1906
George Fawcett 1920, 1921, 1922, 1923, 1924, 1928
Claude Felstead 1906, 1909, 1910, 1911
Paul Fitzgibbon 1993, 1994
Bill Fowler 1929
Marcus Fraser 1999, 2000, 2001
Daniel Gaunt 1996, 1997, 1998
Andrew Getson 1997
Terry Gilmore 1974, 1976
FJ Glover 1912
Bill Gluth 1947, 1950, 1951, 1953, 1954, 1955
Richard Green 1990, 1991, 1992
Matthew Griffin 2006, 2007, 2008
Craig Haase 1989, 1990, 1991
Ashley Hall 2005, 2006
Stephen Hanson 1982
David Harding 1986, 1987, 1988, 1989
Frank Hargreaves 1904
Kevin Hartley 1958, 1959, 1960, 1961, 1963, 1964, 1965, 1967, 1968, 1969, 1970, 1971, 1972, 1973
Craig Hasthorpe 2009
Ryan Haywood 2000, 2001
Peter Headlam 1926
Will Heffernan 2016, 2017, 2018
Grahame Hellessey 1995
Trevor Henley 1977, 1978, 1980, 1981
Adam Henwood 1992, 1993
Lucas Herbert 2013, 2014, 2015
Luke Hickmott 2001, 2002, 2003, 2004
Randall Hicks 1969, 1970, 1971, 1972, 1973, 1977
Bill Higgins 1938, 1939, 1946, 1947, 1952, 1957
Nathan Holman 2010, 2011, 2012, 2013
John Hood 1958, 1959, 1960, 1961, 1962, 1963, 1964, 1968, 1969
Tom Power Horan 2013, 2014, 2015
Anthony Houston 2011, 2012, 2013
Jim Howden 1904, 1905, 1908, 1909, 1910, 1911, 1912
Cameron Howell 1986, 1987, 1988
Bradley Hughes 1986, 1987, 1988
Leslie Penfold Hyland 1904
Gus Jackson 1922, 1925, 1926, 1927, 1928, 1930, 1933, 1934, 1935, 1936, 1937, 1938
Ray Jenner 1973, 1974, 1975, 1976, 1977, 1978, 1979, 1982, 1983
Cameron John 2016, 2017
Phillip Johns 1989, 1990
Steven Jones 2005
Martin Joyce 1998, 2000
Ralph Judd 1958, 1961, 1962, 1963, 1964
Andrew Kelly 2006
John Kelly 1977, 1978, 1979, 1980
Ken Kilburn 1965, 1966, 1969, 1974, 1975
Jim Kirby 1981, 1982, 1983, 1984
Andrew Labrooy 1986, 1987
Brad Lamb 1996, 1997, 1998, 1999
Andre Lautee 2019
Marc Leishman 2003, 2004
K Lewis 1976
Tony Limon 1970, 1971
John Lindsay 1970, 1971, 1972, 1973, 1974, 1975, 1976, 1977, 1978, 1981, 1982, 1983, 1984, 1985
Norman Lockhart 1927, 1930
Jeremy Loomes 2007
Jarrod Lyle 2002, 2003, 2004
Leighton Lyle 2006, 2008
Richard Macafee 2000
Bryden Macpherson 2008, 2009
Keith Macpherson 1954, 1955, 1956, 1957, 1958, 1959, 1960, 1962
LM MacPherson 1931, 1934
FS Mann 1910
Andrew Martin 2004, 2005
Jamie McCallum 1993, 1994, 1995, 1996
Stephen McCraw 1988, 1989
Trevor McDonald 1971, 1972
Harry McGain 1965, 1966, 1967, 1968
James McMillan 2012
Ben Meyers 1998
Kyle Michel 2016, 2017, 2018, 2019
Lukas Michel 2016, 2017, 2018, 2019
David Micheluzzi 2015, 2016, 2017, 2018
Hartley Mitchell 1948, 1949, 1950, 1955
Paul Moloney 1986, 1987, 1988, 1989, 1990
DM Morgan 1909, 1910
Sloan Morpeth 1932, 1933
George Morrison 1910, 1911
Hector Morrison 1907, 1912, 1920, 1921, 1922, 1924
Frank Murdoch 1909, 1911, 1912, 1913, 1921, 1922
Zach Murray 2014, 2016, 2017, 2018
William Nankivell 1928
Max Nunn 1956
Geoff Ogilvy 1995, 1996, 1997
Matthew Oldham 1995
Dick O'Shea 1961
Les O'Shea 1960, 1961, 1962, 1963, 1964, 1965, 1967
A Patterson 1913
Dick Payne 1935, 1936, 1937, 1938, 1939, 1946, 1947, 1948, 1949
Bruce Pearce 1920, 1921, 1924
Cameron Percy 1996, 1997
Doug Perry 1975, 1978, 1983
Jason Perry 2006
Charles Petley 1911, 1912
Adam Porker 2004
Kieran Pratt 2009, 2010
Alistair Presnell 2003
B Price 1988
Tom Prowse 2006, 2007, 2008
Graeme Quinlan 1994, 1995
Eric Quirk 1913, 1920, 1922, 1923, 1924, 1925, 1929
Alex Rae 1933, 1936, 1937, 1939
Alan Reiter 1967, 1968, 1973, 1974, 1975
Don Reiter 1966, 1967, 1968, 1969, 1970, 1972, 1973, 1974
I Rhodes 1937
Walter Carre Riddell 1905, 1906, 1907, 1908, 1909, 1910, 1911, 1913
R Robson 1904, 1906
Eric Routley 1949, 1950, 1951, 1952, 1953, 1954, 1955, 1956, 1958, 1959, 1960, 1961, 1962, 1963, 1964, 1966, 1968
Ryan Ruffels 2013, 2014, 2015
Alex Russell 1920, 1921, 1922, 1925, 1926, 1927, 1928, 1929, 1930, 1931
Tom Rutledge 1920, 1921, 1923
Mick Ryan 1929, 1930, 1931, 1932, 1933, 1934, 1935, 1936, 1937, 1939, 1946
Michael Sammells 1985, 1986, 1987
Matias Sanchez 2017, 2018, 2019
Abe Schlapp 1923, 1924, 1925, 1926, 1928, 1929
Henry Schlapp 1923, 1925, 1931, 1934
Andrew Schonewille 2014, 2015, 2016
LE Schwarz 1926
Craig Scott 2001, 2003
Michael Scott 1904, 1905, 1907, 1908, 1909
Stuart Seear 1985
James Sharp 1923, 1924, 1927
Bob Shearer 1970
Todd Sinnott 2011, 2012, 2013, 2014
Vic Sleigh 1958
C Smith 1931, 1932
David Smith 1980, 1981, 1982, 1983, 1984, 1985
Paul Spargo 2001, 2002
Craig Spence 1994, 1995
Doug Stephens 1956
Kane Streat 2004, 2005
John Sutherland 1997, 1998, 1999, 2000
Peter Sweeney 1976, 1977, 1978, 1979, 1980, 1981, 1983
Stephen Symons 1992, 1993, 1994
Andrew Tampion 2002, 2003, 2004, 2005
Chris Tatt 1979, 1980, 1981, 1982, 1983, 1984
Jamie Taylor 1990, 1991, 1992
Paul Thompson 1985
Peter Thomson 1948
Neil Titheridge 1961, 1962, 1963, 1964, 1965, 1966, 1967
Alan Toe 1959, 1960
Ashley Umbers 2007, 2008, 2009, 2010
Gavin Vearing 1991, 1993, 1994, 1995
Terry Vogel 2009, 2010, 2011, 2012
John Wade 1986, 1988, 1989, 1990
David Walker 2004, 2005
Jason Wallis 2001, 2002
Fred Waters 1906, 1907, 1908
Andrew Webster 1996, 1997, 1998, 1999, 2000
Barry West 1949, 1950, 1951, 1952, 1954, 1955, 1956, 1957
Ivo Whitton 1912, 1913, 1920, 1921, 1922, 1923, 1924, 1926, 1927, 1929, 1930, 1931, 1932, 1933, 1935, 1938
Harry Williams 1931, 1932, 1934, 1936, 1937, 1938, 1939
Mark Williamson 1996, 1997, 1999
Graham Wilson 1950, 1951, 1952, 1954, 1955
Rick Wines 1971, 1972, 1973, 1974, 1975, 1976
Tim Wise 1999, 2000
Eric Wishart 1953, 1954, 1956, 1957, 1958
Mark Wishart 1985, 1986, 1987, 1988
Ryan Woodward 2011, 2012
Josh Younger 2006, 2007, 2008

Western Australia
Western Australia first competed in 1939 and played in all subsequent events.

R Abbott 1962
Dean Alaban 1991, 1992, 1993, 1994, 1995, 1999, 2000, 2001
Brendon Allanby 2019
Fritz Arnold 2013
Warren Baker 1965, 1966, 1970, 1971, 1972, 1973, 1974
John Banting 1947, 1948, 1953
John Banting 1981
Haydn Barron 2016, 2017, 2018, 2019
Dennis Bell 1957, 1958, 1959, 1960, 1961, 1962, 1963, 1964, 1965, 1966, 1967, 1968, 1969, 1970, 1971, 1972, 1973, 1974, 1975
Craig Bishop 1998
Ted Blackman 1952
Peter Blake 1961, 1962, 1963, 1964, 1965, 1967, 1976
Garry Briggs 1974, 1975, 1977, 1978, 1979, 1980
Chris Bright 1987, 1989, 1991, 1992
David Broadhurst 1947, 1949, 1956
Ryan Bulloch 2001, 2002, 2003
Gavin Bunning 1946, 1951
Glenn Carbon 1976, 1977, 1978, 1979, 1981, 1982, 1983, 1984, 1985, 1986, 1987, 1988, 1989, 1990, 1993
Peter Carbon 1969, 1972, 1973, 1974, 1976, 1977, 1978, 1979, 1981, 1984, 1985, 1986, 1987
James Carr 2006
Greg Carroll 1984
T Catling 1970, 1973
Greg Chalmers 1992, 1993, 1994
Paul Chappell 2014
Ray Chow 2011, 2012
Sherman Chua 2013
D Clarke 1957, 1959, 1960
Steve Collins 1990, 1991, 1992, 1993
J Conway 1959, 1961, 1969
Nick Crundall 1992, 1994, 1995, 1996, 1997, 1998, 1999, 2000
Nicholas Curnow 2015, 2016
Charlie Currall 1946, 1947, 1948, 1949, 1950, 1951, 1952, 1953
Myles Cuthbert 1987, 1988, 1989, 1990
Stephen Dartnall 2004, 2005, 2006
Adam Davey 1997, 1998
Kiran Day 2014, 2015, 2016, 2017, 2018
Michael Dennis 2002, 2003, 2004, 2005, 2006, 2007, 2008, 2009, 2011, 2012, 2013, 2014
Harold Digney 1954, 1955, 1956, 1957, 1958, 1960, 1961, 1962, 1963
Jordan Doull 2017
Trevor Downing 1970, 1971, 1972, 1974, 1975
Bill Eddy 1958, 1959, 1960, 1961
D Elliott 1988
Tim Elliott 1982, 1983, 1984
Jon Evans 1985, 1986
D Ewart 1975, 1976
John Ewing 1964, 1965, 1966, 1967, 1968, 1969, 1970, 1971, 1972, 1973, 1974, 1975, 1976, 1977, 1978, 1979, 1980
Shane Feldman 2019
Jarryd Felton 2012, 2013, 2014, 2015
Kim Felton 1994, 1995, 1996, 1997, 1998
Ben Ferguson 2014, 2015, 2016, 2017, 2018
Connor Fewkes 2018, 2019
Don Flavel 1963, 1964, 1965, 1966, 1967, 1968, 1972
Michael Foster 2005, 2006, 2007, 2008
Daniel Fox 1996, 2002
Terry Gale 1966, 1967, 1968, 1969, 1970, 1971, 1973, 1974, 1975
Darren Garrett 1999, 2000
Cooper Geddes 2017, 2018
Marco Gemignani 1988
Stephen Gibbs 2000
Tom Glendinning 1956, 1958, 1960
Oliver Goss 2010, 2011, 2012
Andrew Gott 1987
Des Grantham 1955
Chris Gray 1987, 1988, 1989, 1990
P Green 1977, 1978
Joshua Greer 2018, 2019
D Grey 1962
Brenton Haines 2004, 2006, 2007, 2009, 2010
Bob Hall 1939, 1946, 1947, 1948, 1949, 1950, 1952
Colin Hallam 1986
Larry Harke 1948, 1949, 1950, 1951, 1952, 1955
Pat Harness 1975, 1979, 1980, 1981
Ogilvie Harrington 1939
Adam Hatch 2017
Joshua Herrero 2019
Daniel Hoeve 2010, 2011, 2012, 2013
Hayden Hopewell 2019
Scott Hunter 2005, 2006, 2007, 2008
Matt Jager 2007, 2008, 2009
Clarence Jayatilaka 1984, 1985
Phil Johnson 1981, 1982, 1983, 1984, 1985, 1986
Barry Jones 1957, 1958, 1959, 1960, 1972, 1979
Cameron Jones 2015, 2016
Jordan Jung 2019
Calum Juniper 2017
Brad King 1983, 1984, 1985, 1986
L Korn 1993
Rick Kulacz 2000, 2001, 2002, 2003, 2004, 2005, 2006, 2007
Simon Lacey 1995, 1997
Stephen Leaney 1988, 1989, 1990, 1991, 1992
Don Leary 1980, 1981, 1982
Fred Lee 2016, 2018
Min Woo Lee 2013, 2014, 2015, 2016, 2017, 2018
Norm Lewis 1949, 1950, 1951, 1952, 1953
Brady Lord 2001, 2002
Curtis Luck 2012, 2013, 2014, 2015, 2016
Roger Mackay 1977, 1978, 1979, 1980, 1981, 1982
Shaun Malone 2009
Craig Mann 1985, 1986
Graham Marsh 1962, 1963, 1964, 1965, 1966, 1967
John Martino 2008
Gordon McAlpine 1939, 1946
Tony McFadyean 2002, 2003
Dave McMullan 1961, 1962, 1963, 1964, 1965
Bill McPherson 1950, 1951, 1952, 1953, 1955, 1957, 1958, 1960
Alister Miles 2003
Tony Mills 1987, 1988, 1989
Brett Mollison 1987, 1988, 1989, 1990, 1991
Michael Montgomery 2014
Grant Morgan 1990, 1991, 1995, 1996, 1997, 1998, 1999
Jarrod Moseley 1992, 1993, 1994, 1995, 1996
Andy Mowatt 1982, 1983, 1986
John Muller 1967, 1968, 1969, 1970, 1971, 1973
Brendon Nazar 2004
Stan Nicholas 1959
Brody Ninyette 2007, 2008, 2009, 2010, 2011
Paul Norcliffe 1980
Bob Norton 1951, 1954, 1955
Brad Park 1989, 1990, 1991, 1992, 1993, 1994, 1995, 1996
DJ Parker 1968
R Parker 1959, 1960, 1963, 1968, 1969
Craig Parry 1983, 1984, 1985
Roy Paxton 1949, 1950, 1951
Ryan Peake 2010, 2011, 2012
R Petersen 1977, 1978
Terry Pilkadaris 1997
Keith Pix 1939, 1946, 1947
Pat Prendiville 1953, 1954, 1956, 1960
Cameron Prentice 1994
Peter Randall 1969, 1970, 1971, 1972, 1973, 1974, 1975, 1976
Gavin Reed 2008, 2009, 2010
Lincoln Reemeyer 1999, 2000, 2001
Bill Reid 1980, 1981, 1982, 1983
Norman Robinson 1939
Kelly Rogers 1947, 1948, 1950, 1952, 1957
Brett Rumford 1994, 1995, 1996, 1997, 1998, 1999
Lionel Sangster 1962, 1964
Jason Scrivener 2007, 2008, 2009
Benjamin Seward 2015
Doug Sewell 1946
Justin Seward 1947, 1949, 1950, 1951, 1952, 1953, 1954, 1955, 1956, 1957, 1958, 1959, 1960, 1961
Vernon Sexton-Finck 1999, 2000, 2001, 2002, 2003, 2004
David Shaw 1980
Michael Sim 2001, 2002, 2003, 2004, 2005
Glen Slatter 1991
Gordon Smith 1939
M Smith 1998
Wayne Smith 1982, 1983
B Soulsby 1976, 1977, 1978
Gary Spinks 1966, 1968
Cruze Strange 2011
Scott Strange 1996, 1997, 1998, 1999, 2000, 2001
Ken Stronach 1953, 1954, 1955, 1956, 1961
Bob Strutton 1954
Darren Tan 2003, 2004, 2005
Ted Taylor 1939, 1946, 1948, 1952, 1954, 1955, 1956, 1958
Len Thomas 1956
Len Tidy 1963, 1964, 1965, 1966, 1967
Tigh Van Leeuwen 2005, 2006
Ray Wark 1948
Jamie Warman 2010
Brady Watt 2009, 2010, 2011, 2012, 2013
G Wilson 1976
Ross Woolf 1993, 1994

See also
 Vicars Shield
 Australian Women's Interstate Teams Matches

References

Team golf tournaments
Amateur golf tournaments in Australia
Recurring sporting events established in 1904
1904 establishments in Australia